Felicidades may refer to:

 Merry Christmas (2000 film) (Felicidades), a 2000 Argentine-Italian comedy drama film
 Felicidades (album), a 1979 album by Menudo